Fred Scott (11 April 1874 – 8 July 1969) was an Australian rules footballer who played with Essendon and Carlton in the Victorian Football League (VFL).

Notes

External links 

		
Fred Scott's profile at Blueseum

1874 births
1969 deaths
VFL/AFL players born outside Australia
Australian Rules footballers: place kick exponents
Essendon Football Club players
Carlton Football Club players
Australian rules footballers from Victoria (Australia)
People from Ulster
People educated at Scotch College, Melbourne
Irish players of Australian rules football
Irish emigrants to colonial Australia